Han Yiguang is a former footballer who last played for Woodlands Wellington FC in the S-League as a defensive midfielder / right-back. He is currently the Under-17 & Under-21 coach at Hougang United Football Club and designated as the Head of Youth at the Club. Previously, he was the Under-15 coach at Balestier Khalsa FC. He has a diploma in Sport and Wellness Management from Nanyang Polytechnic.

He started off his S-League career with Balestier Khalsa Football Club where he played a total of 27 matches in the span of two years before he decided to head to Woodlands Wellington to play for the Rams.

Despite his small frame, Yiguang is known to be a tough tackling midfielder who helps the defence to snuff out opposing attacks. His combative spirit has drawn comparisons to former Woodlands captain and defensive midfielder, Goh Tat Chuan. Yiguang plays as right-back occasionally too. He was even considered for national call-up at one point.

Coaching career 

In 2013, he retired from professional football and became to a Centre of Excellence football coach. He coached the Under-14 team at Woodlands Wellington.

In 2014, he moved to Balestier Khalsa FC to coach the Under-15 team. In 2018, he moved to Hougang United Football Club to coach the Under-17 and Under-21 team where he is currently at. His player-centric coaching style and forward thinking coaching methods makes him a promising youth coach in Singapore.

Club Career Statistics

Han Yiguang's Profile

All numbers encased in brackets signify substitute appearances.

References

1985 births
Living people
Balestier Khalsa FC players
Singaporean footballers
Woodlands Wellington FC players
Singapore Premier League players
Singaporean sportspeople of Chinese descent
Association football defenders
Association football midfielders
Singaporean football managers